ARMH3 or Armadillo Like Helical Domain Containing 3, also known as UPF0668 and c10orf76, is a protein that in humans is encoded by the ARMH3 gene. Its function is not currently known, but experimental evidence has suggested that it may be involved in transcriptional regulation. The protein contains a conserved proline-rich motif, suggesting that it may participate in protein-protein interactions via an SH3-binding domain, although no such interactions have been experimentally verified. The well-conserved gene appears to have emerged in Fungi approximately 1.2 billion years ago. The locus is alternatively spliced and predicted to yield five protein variants, three of which contain a protein domain of unknown function, DUF1741.

Function 

It has been found to contain a potential SH3-binding domain, which is known to participate in protein-protein binding interactions; however, no protein interactions have been experimentally verified with c10orf76. A 2007 gene expression study found c10orf76 expression to vary inversely with the expression of several other genes, including NFYB, CCR5, and NSBP1, suggesting that the protein may function as a transcriptional regulator.

Homology 
ARMH3 is well-conserved throughout Eumetazoans. Some weakly similar orthologs (approximately 35% sequence identity) were identified in Parazoa (i.e., A. queenslandica) and in Fungi, specifically Ascomycetes (i.e., A. oryzae).

The following table illustrates the sequence similarity between human c10orf76 protein and various orthologs. Similar sequences were identified with BLAST and BLAT tools.

Gene

Characteristics 

In humans, the ARMH3 gene, also known by the alias FLJ13114, spans 210,577 base pairs on the reverse strand of the long arm of chromosome 10. Its 26 alternatively spliced exons encode 5 potential transcript variants, the largest of which being 4101 base pairs in length.

The human ARMH3 locus is flanked on the left and right sides by HPS6 and KCNIP2, respectively. HPS6 is a protein that may play a role in organelle biogenesis, and KCNIP2 is a voltage-gated potassium channel interacting protein. The same pattern is observed in the orthologous locus in mice, as well as most other vertebrates.

Expression 

The NCBI (GenBank) gene profile for c10orf76 labels the start of the first transcribed exon as the beginning of the gene. The primary promoter predicted by the El Dorado tool from Genomatix begins 519 base pairs upstream of this transcription start site. This promoter is predicted to be 658 base pairs in length and thus includes the first transcribed exon at its 3 prime end.

The c10orf76 locus is thought to be alternatively spliced into at least five unique isoforms, although it is unclear how this splicing is regulated. A second potential promoter, also predicted by El Dorado, likely drives expression of one of the shorter documented variants (positioned before exon 23).

Protein

Characteristics 

The largest protein variant is 689 amino acids in length. It has a molecular mass of approximately 78.7kDa and is isoelectric at pH 6.13. It may be secreted via a non-classical pathway. NCBI identifies a protein domain of unknown function between amino acids Asp435 and Leu671, known as DUF1741 (Domain of Unknown Function 1741). This domain is not known to exist in any other proteins.

Expression 

A potential stem loop region at the 3 prime end of the first exon (and thus, the end of the promoter) was predicted by the Dotlet program from ExPASy. This could serve to regulate protein translation. Also, an Alu segment in the 3 prime untranslated region of the mature mRNA could serve as a potential translational regulatory mechanism.

The protein has been found to be differentially expressed in some medical conditions and in response to certain cellular signals. For example, decreased c10orf76 expression is observed in patients with chronic B-cell lymphocytic leukemia. Decreased expression is also observed in cells treated with vascular endothelial growth factor.

The protein is thought to be localized to the cytoplasm, although this is uncertain. It has also been predicted to be a 3-pass transmembrane protein. Also, a mitochondrial sorting signal was identified at the beginning of one of the protein isoforms using MitoProt II (located at Met416 of the largest protein variant).

Structure 

The structure of the c10orf76 protein has not been experimentally explored. The secondary structure is predicted to be completely helical in nature, with intervening regions of protein disorder. The potential SH3-binding domain is located on a predicted region of disorder, further supporting a protein-protein binding function for c10orf76. A helical region between amino acids 610-655 was predicted to be a coiled coil motif.

A PHYRE2 protein structure prediction suggested that the first 200 residues of c10orf76 may share strong structural similarities with Symplekin, a nuclear-localized protein that is thought to be a scaffold component of the polyadenylation complex.

Predicted protein Interactions 

The expression of c10orf76 mRNA has been found to be inversely correlated with expression of various other mRNAs, including NFYB, CCR5, and NSBP1. Although this study and the predicted SH3-binding domain suggest that c10orf76 partakes in protein-protein binding interactions, none have been experimentally verified. A short search using IntAct, MINT, and STRING also yielded zero predicted protein-protein interactions.

Predicted posttranslational modifications 

There is a potential that the protein is secreted via a non-classical pathway, which may underlie the functionality of some of the posttranslational modifications. There are ten conserved potential phosphorylation sites within the protein sequence. Also, there are nine residues that are confidently (>90%) predicted by NetOGlyc to undergo O-linked glycosylation, all residing within the low complexity region between Leu325 and Ser359.

Regions of potential research interest 

The protein coded by the largest mRNA variant of c10orf76 encodes a proline-rich motif containing two PxxP domains, where "P" represents a proline residue and "x" represents any other amino acid (highlighted in blue below). These domains have been shown to participate in protein-protein binding interactions, specifically via the SH3 protein binding domain. The potential SH3-binding domain exists within a low complexity region with an unusually high number of amino acids with oxygen-containing side-groups (highlighted in green below). An NetOGlyc analysis of the region suggests that these residues are likely to undergo O-linked glycosylation and thus may serve to regulate binding to the potential SH3-binding domain.
 
 325  L V T T P V S P A P T T P V T P L G T T P P S S    359 

An Alu element was identified in the 3`-UTR of the longest mRNA transcript variant It is unclear as to whether this sequence serves any functional or regulatory purpose, but there is existing evidence for Alu-mediated protein translation regulation, so this cannot be ruled out in c10orf76.

The N-terminus of a short transcript variant (exons 17-26) was predicted to have a mitochondrial sorting signal with 96% confidence using the MitoProt II tool. It is unclear as to whether this is a uniquely transcribed variant or it results from protein cleavage of the full-size protein. There are no predicted alternative promoters upstream of this variant's first exon.

Model organisms
Model organisms have been used in the study of C10orf76 function. A conditional knockout mouse line called 9130011E15Riktm1a(EUCOMM)Wtsi was generated at the Wellcome Trust Sanger Institute. Male and female animals underwent a standardized phenotypic screen to determine the effects of deletion. Additional screens performed:  - In-depth immunological phenotyping - in-depth bone and cartilage phenotyping

References

External links